Sirius Academy West (formerly Sirius Academy, Pickering High School, Kingston High School and The Boulevard) is a secondary school in Hull, England. It was renamed Sirius Academy in September 2009 under Building Schools for the Future, with Sports College specialist status.

History
The last headteacher of Pickering High School was Elaine Wadsworth, who was replaced by a principal, Cathy Taylor, when the school became an academy.

In September 2011 the school moved into a new £48.5 million building which replaced an older one, bringing the school within one site, with a new sports hall to support sports college status.

The school's GCSE results have improved over the years.

After becoming an academy the school was originally known as Sirius Academy. However, in 2015 Thomas Ferens Academy joined the Sirius Academy Multi Academy Trust and was renamed Sirius Academy North. Sirius Academy was renamed Sirius Academy West to distinguish the two institutions.

Facilities
School facilities include an all-weather pitch, sports hall, sports lab, hair and beauty salon, industrial quality food technology rooms, dance studio, construction bays and an eco-dome.

Ofsted
The 2003 Ofsted inspection rated the school as Grade 2 "Good", highlighting strengths, and improvements to be made.

Strengths:
 Very good leadership and management by the headteacher and managerial teaching staff
 Good teaching in lessons resulting in good learning and positive relationships
 Provisions made for special education needs (SEN) pupils
 Systems for monitoring pupil progression
Improvements were suggested in:
 Teaching, particularly in mathematics
 The greater use of ICT to assist learning
 Attendance and punctuality
 The modernising of teaching and recreational areas to improve learning and safety

In March 2014 an Ofsted inspection rated the school as Outstanding in all areas.

Pastoral support 
Sirius Academy West runs a points-based reward system to encourage good behaviour, done through collecting stamps in the custom planners given to each student, and a one-to-one mentoring scheme.

Former pupils

Kingston High School
Amy Johnson
Tom Courtenay
John Alderton
 Alan Plater

References

Further reading
 A Hull School in Wartime: Kingston High School's Evacuation to Scarborough (paperback) by John D. Hicks 
 Bob Rosner (2005)  One of the Lucky Ones: rescued by the Kindertransport.Beth Shalom, Newark (England) .

External links
Official website
  School's Ofsted Report
GCSE Results in more detail
(http://www.oldkingstonianshull.org.uk/ Old Kingstonians' Association website)

Academies in Kingston upon Hull
Educational institutions established in 1895
Secondary schools in Kingston upon Hull
1895 establishments in England